KMBD-LD, virtual channel 43 (UHF digital channel 20), is a low-powered Bounce TV-affiliated television station licensed to Minneapolis, Minnesota, United States. The station is owned by HC2 Holdings. The station's transmitter is located in the IDS Center.

History 
The station signed on the air as K67HG on October 5, 1998. The station broadcast on UHF analog channels 35 (as K35CY) and 67. It moved to channel 43 after the callsign was changed to K43HB in 2007. The station was an affiliate of the Home Shopping Network from its 1998 inception until 2014, when DTV America acquired the station from Ventana Television. The station converted to digital in January 2012, remaining on channel 43 as a digital station, with a 15-kilowatt signal. On November 17, 2014, DTV America changed the station callsign to the current KMBD-LD. DTV America converted KMBD as a satellite station of former TBN owned-and-operated station KJNK-LD, retransmitting Telemundo programming on its main channel, and Doctor Television Channel, and eventually Sonlife Broadcasting Network programming on KMBD-LD2 simulcasting with KJNK-LD2.

In January 2016, KMBD-LD and KMBD-LD2 were converted to affiliates of Bounce TV and Escape affiliates, respectively, and a third digital subchannel was launched to serve as a Laff network affiliate, thereby making KMBD-LD a separate station again after more than a year as a satellite of KJNK-LD.

In October 2018, owner HC2 Holdings shifted most of KMBD-LD's programming slate to sister station K33LN-D, leaving channel 43 silent ahead of KMBD-LD's expected move to channel 20. KMBD-LD resumed broadcasting on channel 20 around September 25, 2020.

Digital channels
The station's digital signal is multiplexed:

References

External links

Bounce TV affiliates
Ion Mystery affiliates
Laff (TV network) affiliates
Cozi TV affiliates
Television stations in Minneapolis–Saint Paul
Low-power television stations in the United States
Innovate Corp.
Television channels and stations established in 1998